Strongylognathus kratochvilli is a species of ant in the genus Strongylognathus. It is endemic to the Czech Republic.

References

Strongylognathus
Hymenoptera of Europe
Endemic fauna of the Czech Republic
Insects described in 1937
Taxonomy articles created by Polbot